Melanie Bronze dos Santos (born 12 July 1995) is a Portuguese triathlete. She won the gold medal at the 2018 Mediterranean Games in the women's individual sprint. In 2021, she competed in the women's event at the 2020 Summer Olympics in Tokyo, Japan.

Early life 
She started practising triathlon at 15 years old.

Personal life 
She is in a relationship with Portuguese triathlete João Pereira. They both represent Benfica and the Portuguese national team. In 2018, they both won the gold medal in the individual events of the 2018 Mediterranean Games.

References 

1995 births
Living people
Sportspeople from Basel-Stadt
Portuguese female athletes
Portuguese female triathletes
Duathletes
S.L. Benfica (triathlon)
Competitors at the 2018 Mediterranean Games
Mediterranean Games gold medalists for Portugal
Mediterranean Games medalists in triathlon
European Games competitors for Portugal
Triathletes at the 2015 European Games
Triathletes at the 2020 Summer Olympics
Olympic triathletes of Portugal
Swiss people of Portuguese descent
21st-century Portuguese women